Tihi railway station (station code: TIHI) is a local railway station in Pithampur in the suburb of Indore. This station lies on the unfinished Indore–Dahod line. The station was built for operations of goods and container trains providing direct connectivity to the industries in Pithampur.

Development
Tihi station is primarily aimed to be an industrial transport station and various pacts have been linked to ensure that the upcoming multi-modal logistics park and nearby industrial region is well connected with other ports of India via the station.

See also 
 Akola–Ratlam (metre-gauge trains)
 Indore Junction railway station
 Mhow railway station

References

Railway stations in Indore
Ratlam railway division
Railway stations in Indore district